Providence, Kentucky is a city in Webster County, Kentucky.

Providence, Kentucky is also the name of:

Providence, Simpson County, Kentucky
Providence, Trimble County, Kentucky